Rough and tumble fighting (Rough-and-tumble) was a form of fighting in rural portions of the United States, primarily in the eighteenth and nineteenth centuries. It was often characterized by the objective of gouging but also included other brutally disfiguring techniques, including biting, and typically took place in order to settle disputes.

Popularity
Though gouging was common by the 1730s in southern colonies, the practice was waning by the 1840s, by which time the Bowie knife and revolver had made frontier disputes more lethal.
Though it was never an organized sport, participants would sometimes schedule their fights (as one could schedule a duel), and victors were treated as local heroes.  Gouging was essentially a type of duel to defend one's honor that was most common among the poor, and was especially common in southern states in the late eighteenth and early nineteenth centuries.

Practice
When a dispute arose, fighters could either agree to fight "fair", meaning according to Broughton's rules, or "rough and tumble".  According to Elliott Gorn,

Ears, noses, lips, fingers and genitals could be disfigured in these fights, but Gorn notes:

The practice spread at least as far west as rural Missouri, where "a particularly dextrous fellow could pluck his opponent's eyeballs from their sockets with one good thrust of the thumbs". This disfigurement may have been subsequently construed as a visible sign of dishonor.  Though the practice was widespread, it was "best suited to the backwoods", according to Gorn.

Though legend sometimes amplifies the brutality of these fights, Gorn emphasizes the historical reality of these events:

Legislation
An act passed by the Virginia Assembly in 1752 begins by remarking that "many mischievous and ill disposed persons have of late, in a malicious and barbarous manner, maimed, wounded, and defaced, many of his majesty's subjects", then very specifically makes it a felony to "put out an eye, slit the nose, bite or cut off a nose, or lip", among other offenses.  The Assembly went on to amend the act in 1772 to make it clear that this included "gouging, plucking or putting out an eye." Court cases and legal rulings in Tennessee, South Carolina, and Arkansas provide ample evidence of the history of this type of fighting.

See also
 Mutual combat
 Duel 
 Street fighting 
 Bare-knuckle boxing
 Vale Tudo

References 

North American martial arts
Hybrid martial arts
Human eye
Violence in sports